Hirtaeschopalaea is a genus of longhorn beetles of the subfamily Lamiinae, containing the following species:

 Hirtaeschopalaea albolineata Pic, 1925
 Hirtaeschopalaea borneensis Breuning, 1963
 Hirtaeschopalaea celebensis Breuning, 1969
 Hirtaeschopalaea dorsana Holzschuh, 1999
 Hirtaeschopalaea fasciculata Breuning, 1938
 Hirtaeschopalaea nubila (Matsushita, 1933)
 Hirtaeschopalaea robusta Breuning, 1938

References

Lamiinae